The 1960–61 NCAA University Division men's basketball season began in December 1960, progressed through the regular season and conference tournaments, and concluded with the 1961 NCAA University Division basketball tournament championship game on March 25, 1961, at Municipal Auditorium in Kansas City, Missouri. The Cincinnati Bearcats won their first NCAA national championship with a 70–65 victory in overtime over the Ohio State Buckeyes.

Season headlines 
 A gambling scandal rocked the NCAA University Division and resulted in the arrests of 37 students from 22 different colleges and universities.
In the 1961 NCAA University Division basketball tournament national third-place game, Saint Joseph's defeated  127–120 in four overtimes, tying the record for the longest game in NCAA tournament history, set in 1956 in a first-round game between Canisius and North Carolina State. The Saint Joseph's victory later was vacated because of the gambling scandal.

Season outlook

Pre-season polls 

The Top 20 from the AP Poll and the UPI Coaches Poll during the pre-season.

Conference membership changes

Regular season

Conference winners and tournaments

Informal championships

Statistical leaders

Post-season tournaments

NCAA tournament

Final Four 

 Third Place – St. Joseph's 127, Utah 120 (4OT)

National Invitation tournament

Semifinals & finals 

 Third Place – Holy Cross 85, Dayton 67

Awards

Consensus All-American teams

Major player of the year awards 

 Helms Player of the Year: Jerry Lucas, Ohio State
 Associated Press Player of the Year:Jerry Lucas, Ohio State
 UPI Player of the Year: Jerry Lucas, Ohio State
 Oscar Robertson Trophy (USBWA): Jerry Lucas, Ohio State
 Sporting News Player of the Year: Jerry Lucas, Ohio State

Major coach of the year awards 

 Henry Iba Award: Fred Taylor, Ohio State
 NABC Coach of the Year: Fred Taylor, Ohio State
 UPI Coach of the Year: Fred Taylor, Ohio State

Other major awards 

 Robert V. Geasey Trophy (Top player in Philadelphia Big 5): Bruce Drysdale, Temple
 NIT/Haggerty Award (Top player in New York City metro area): Tony Jackson, St. John's

Coaching changes 

A number of teams changed coaches during the season and after it ended.

References